Wilfred Bott (25 April 1907 – July 1992) was an English professional footballer who played as a left winger in the Football League.

Career
Born in Featherstone, Yorkshire, to parents Frederick and Harriet, Bott played for Edlington Colliery Welfare before moving to Football League side Doncaster Rovers in 1927. In his time at Doncaster he scored 33 goals in 120 league and cup games, his last season being the most successful with 17 goals in 28 games including two hat−tricks within three games. His performances brought the attentions of other teams and led to his transfer for a reported "substantial fee" to First Division Huddersfield Town towards the end of the 1930−31 season.

Following a very successful period at Huddersfield, Bott went on to have spells at Newcastle United, Queens Park Rangers, Colchester United and Lancaster Town.

Honours

Club
 Huddersfield Town
 Football League First Division runner-up: 1933–34

References

 
 Wilf Bott at Colchester United Archive Database
 Wilf Bott on Pathe Video at 1'39"

1907 births
1992 deaths
Sportspeople from Featherstone
English footballers
Association football wingers
Doncaster Rovers F.C. players
Huddersfield Town A.F.C. players
Newcastle United F.C. players
Queens Park Rangers F.C. players
Colchester United F.C. players
Lancaster City F.C. players
English Football League players